Mathrubhumi Literary Award (also known as Mathrubhumi Sahitya Puraskaram) is a literary award instituted in 2001 by leading Malayalam daily Mathrubhumi. A sum of 3 lakh, a plaque and citation constitute the award. The award is conferred as a recognition of a writer's overall contribution to the Malayalam literature.

Recipients

See also
 List of Malayalam literary awards

References

Indian literary awards
Malayalam literary awards
Awards established in 2001
2001 establishments in Kerala